Padus Vallis is a valley in the Memnonia quadrangle on Mars that empties into the Medusa Fossae Formation.  It is located at 4.6° S and 150.1° W.  It is 46.0 km long and was named for the classical name for modern Po Valley in Italy.  Padus Vallis is one of many valleys that empty into the Medusae Fossae Formation.

References

Valleys and canyons on Mars
Memnonia quadrangle